Hammurabi II (reigned Middle 17th century BC - Middle chronology) was an obscure king of Yamhad (Halab), probably reigning after Irkabtum.

Identity
Hammurabi II was confused with Hammurabi III, the king of Yamhad who was mentioned as the son of the king of Halab in the annals of Hattusili I.

The Alalakh tablets AlT 21 and AlT 22, (naturally made before the destruction of Alalakh) mentions Hammurabi as king, while the Hammurabi mentioned in the Hittites annals (after the destruction of Alalakh) was attested as the son of king Yarim-Lim and since the destruction of Alalakh occurred while Yarim-Lim III was king, then the Hammurabi in tablets AlT 21 and 22 can not be the same Hammurabi, son and successor of Yarim-Lim III.

Position and Succession
Nothing (except his existence) is known about Hammurabi II. His filiation is unknown but since he is mentioned before the destruction of Alalakh (and Yarim-Lim III was the king during and after the destruction) then he must have been succeeded by Yarim-Lim III (but even this is under debate).

References

Citations

17th-century BC rulers
Kings of Yamhad
People from Aleppo
Amorite kings
Yamhad dynasty
17th-century BC people